WALT-FM (102.1 FM) is a radio station broadcasting in the Meridian, Mississippi, area.  The station, owned by Roger Burke, through licensee Burke Broadcasting, LLC, broadcasts a talk radio format.

WALT-FM is part of the Alert FM digital alert and messaging system for Lauderdale County first responders.

History
On August 20, 2010 WUCL changed their format from country to talk (simulcasting WALT 910 AM) under new calls WALT-FM.

References

External links

Talk radio stations in the United States
ALT-FM
Radio stations established in 1990